"Tú, sólo tú" (You, Only You) is a ranchera song written by Mexican songwriter Felipe Valdés Leal in 1949. That same year the song was recorded by Miguel Aceves Mejía, Pedro Infante, Luis Pérez Meza and Rosita Quintana.

The song was also included in the films Pueblerina (1949), where it was performed by Roberto Cañedo and Columba Domínguez; Perdida (1950), where it was performed by La Torcacita; and Tú, solo tú (1950), where it was performed by Luis Aguilar.

Selena version

Selena recorded a cover version with the Anglicized spelling "Tu Solo Tu". It is the second single (first in Spanish) released from the album Dreaming of You. Her version was originally recorded for the 1995 film Don Juan DeMarco. It was the first Spanish-language single to be released from Selena's recording projects following her death.

Chart performance
The song debuted at number 3 on the Billboard Hot Latin Tracks for the week of July 15, 1995, and climbed to number 1 the following week where it remained for ten weeks, Selena's longest run at number 1.

The single, "I Could Fall In Love", was kept from reaching the top spot on the chart by "Tú sólo tú", but with this feat, Selena became the second performer ever to have singles in the top two spots of the Hot Latin Tracks chart in the same week (the first being Ana Gabriel).

On the Billboard Latin Regional Mexican Airplay chart, the single debuted and peaked at number one, spending nine weeks at the top.

Charts

Certifications

Personnel
José Hernàndez - producer, arranger
Selena - vocals
Mariachi Sol de México - backing vocals and special guests
Bruce Robb - engineer
Robb Bross - mixer

References

1949 songs
Ranchera songs
Flor Silvestre songs
1995 singles
Selena songs
Songs released posthumously